Burino is a rural locality (a village) in Gorod Vyazniki, Vyaznikovsky District, Vladimir Oblast, Russia. The population was 156 as of 2010.

Geography 
Burino is located 17 km north of Vyazniki (the district's administrative centre) by road. Burino (settlement) is the nearest rural locality.

References 

Rural localities in Vyaznikovsky District